Freedom Township, Ohio, may refer to:

Freedom Township, Henry County, Ohio
Freedom Township, Portage County, Ohio
Freedom Township, Wood County, Ohio

Ohio township disambiguation pages